The 1979–80 Northern Rugby Football League season was the 85th season of rugby league football. Sixteen English clubs competed for the Northern Rugby Football League's first division championship, with Bradford claiming the title by finishing on top of the League.

Season summary

 Bradford Northern won their first ever Championship this season. Wigan, Hunslet (having dropped the prefix of 'New' from New Hunslet), York and Blackpool Borough were relegated.
 The Challenge Cup Winners Hull Kingston Rovers who beat city rivals Hull F.C. 10-5 in the final.
 The John Player Trophy Winners were Bradford Northern who beat Widnes 6-0 in the final.
 Rugby League Premiership Trophy Winners were Widnes who beat Bradford Northern 19-5 in the final.
 BBC2 Floodlit Trophy Winners were Hull F.C. who beat city rivals Hull Kingston Rovers 13-3 in the final.
 2nd Division Champions were Featherstone Rovers, Halifax, Oldham and Barrow were also promoted.
 Widnes beat Workington Town (from Cumbria) 11–0 to win the Lancashire County Cup, and Leeds beat Halifax 15–6 to win the Yorkshire County Cup.

League Tables

Championship
Final Standings

Second Division

Challenge Cup

The 1980 State Express Challenge Cup culminated in the first Hull Cup final derby, with a heavy entourage of supporters from the East and West of the city making the trip to London. Hull Kingston Rovers defeated Hull 10-5 at Wembley before a crowd of 95,000.

This was Hull Kingston Rovers’ first, and to date, only Cup Final Win in six Final appearances.

The Hull Kingston Rovers’ Prop, Brian Lockwood, won the Lance Todd Trophy.

League Cup

Premiership

Statistics
The following are the top points scorers in the 1979–80 season.

Most tries

Most goals (including drop goals)

References

Sources
1979-80 Rugby Football League season at wigan.rlfans.com
The Challenge Cup at The Rugby Football League website

1979 in English rugby league
1980 in English rugby league
Northern Rugby Football League seasons